Padma Hazarika is a Bharatiya Janata Party politician from Assam. He was elected in Assam Legislative Assembly election in 1996, 2006, 2011, 2016 and 2021 from Sootea constituency. Formerly, he was with Asom Gana Parishad.

References 

Living people
Assam politicians
Bharatiya Janata Party politicians from Assam
Assam MLAs 1996–2001
Assam MLAs 2006–2011
Assam MLAs 2011–2016
Assam MLAs 2016–2021
Year of birth missing (living people)
Asom Gana Parishad politicians
Assam MLAs 2021–2026